DC Universe is a toy brand manufactured by Mattel. It has five sub-lines – Classics, Fighting Figures, Giants of Justice, Infinite Heroes, and the reintegrated Justice League Unlimited line.

Sub-lines

DC Universe Classics

This is considered by many to be the main line of the DC Universe re-brand. These are 6-inch scale figures based on characters in the entire DC library, an expansion from previous Mattel lines that only allowed for the use of Batman, and later on, Superman characters. The entire line is sculpted by the Four Horsemen Studios.

DC Universe Justice League Unlimited

Previously a line itself, then integrated into the DC Superheroes brand, Justice League Unlimited made its debut as a DC Universe product at the 2008 San Diego Comic-Con with its Giganta figure. Now exclusive to Target stores as of summer 2008, Justice League Unlimited is a collector-focused line consisting of single-, three-, and six-packed figures that have appeared in the animated series, as well as non-animated series characters.

DC Universe Infinite Heroes
This addition to the DC Universe stable takes characters that would appear in the flagship Classics line and puts them at a more collectible 3.75-inch scale. Figures are available as singles and three-packs, with six- and eight-packs available as retailer exclusives. Early statements from Mattel put the total character count for 2008 at around forty-five figures. One of the first six-packs contained characters from the Green Lantern mythos, while another revolves around Gotham City.

Mattel has stated that they are trying to make sure that the characters included in the Infinite Heroes line are not included in the Classics line in the same year to avoid having multiples of the same character on the shelves at once. The figure packages featured clippable Anti-Monitor points, which could be redeemed at the 2009 San Diego Comic-Con for an exclusive Anti-Monitor figure.

Figures typically have limited articulation and minimal accessories. Following the announcement of Hasbro's Marvel Universe line, Mattel announced that the line will get increased articulation (an example is the upcoming Animal Man figure, unveiled at New York Comic Con 2009).

Crisis: Series One Singles
Figure 1 – Black Adam
Figure 2 – Black Hand (modern)
Figure 3 – Adam Strange (modern)
Figure 4 – Captain Marvel
Figure 5 – Guy Gardner
Figure 6 – Professor Zoom
Figure 7 – The Atom (Ryan Choi)
Figure 8 – Hush
Figure 9 – Qwardian Weaponer
Figure 10 – Manhunter Robot (modern)
Figure 11 – Batman
Figure 12 – Power Girl
Figure 13 – Batwoman (Kate Kane)
Figure 14 – The Question
Figure 14 – The Question (trenchcoat variant)
Figure 14 – The Question (orange shirt/yellow tie variant)
Figure 15 – Wildcat (blue uniform)
Figure 15 – Wildcat (black variant)
Figure 16 – Star Sapphire (modern)
Figure 17 – Doctor Fate (modern)
Figure 18 – Black Lightning (modern)
Figure 19 – The Spectre (Crispus Allen)
Figure 20 – The Joker
Figure 20 – The Joker (black suit variant)
Figure 21 – Nightwing (modern)
Figure 22 – Scarecrow
Figure 23 – Arsenal (not released)
Figure 24 – Batman (black/gray costume)
Figure 25 – Superman
Figure 26 – Gotham City S.W.A.T.
Figure 27 – Wonder Woman
Figure 28 – Sinestro (classic)
Figure 29 – The Atom (Ray Palmer)
Figure 30 – Starfire
Figure 31 – Wonder Girl (Cassie Sandsmark)
Figure 32 – Black Canary
Figure 33 – Alexander Luthor
Figure 34 – Batman (blue/gray with yellow oval)
Figure 35 – Thanagarian Wingman
Figure 36 – Green Arrow (modern)
Figure 37 – Hal Jordan
Figure 38 – Lex Luthor
Figure 39 – The Flash (Wally West)
Figure 40 – Lexcorp Trooper (blond hair)
Figure 41 – OMAC #1 (Featured solely in Crisis 3 pack)
Figure 42 – Omac #2
Figure 43 – Supergirl (retro)
Figure 44 – Dying Supergirl (Battle Damaged Variant)
Figure 45 – S.W.A.T. Gordon
Figure 46 – Superman Prime
Figure 47 – Flash (Jay Garrick)
Figure 48 – Flash (Barry Allen)
Figure 49 – Psycho Pirate (Masked Variant)
Figure 50 – Psycho Pirate (Unmasked Variant)
Figure 51 – Red Arrow
Figure 52 – Martian Manhunter
Figure 53 – Blue Beetle
Figure 54 – Bizarro
Figure 55 – Captain Marvel Jr. (not released)
Figure 56 – Mary Batson
Figure 57 – Captain Atom
Figure 58 – Firestorm
Figure infinity – Monitor
Figure infinity – Anti-Monitor

Crisis: Series One 3-packs
Three Pack 1 – Commissioner Gordon, Two Gotham City S.W.A.T. Team Members
Three Pack 2 – Flash (Wally West), Mirror Master, Weather Wizard
Three Pack 3 – Wonder Girl (Cassie Sandsmark), Superman, Supergirl (Kara Zor-El)
Three Pack 4 – Starfire, Captain Boomerang (Owen Mercer), Raven
Three Pack 5 – Green Lantern (Hal Jordan), Green Arrow, Black Canary
Three Pack 6 – Hawkman, Two Thanagarian Soldiers
Three Pack 7 – Lex Luthor, Two LexCorp Troopers (blond hair, variant included figures with brown hair)
Three Pack 8 – Flash (Jay Garrick), Mirror Master, Weather Wizard
Three Pack 9 – Wonder Girl (Cassie Sandsmark), Bizarro, Supergirl (Kara Zor-El)
Three Pack 10 - ??
Three Pack 11 – Captain Marvel, Mary Marvel, Black Adam
Three Pack 12 – Harbinger, Two Shadow Demons
Three Pack 13 – Green Lantern (Hal Jordan), Star Sapphire, Black Hand
Three Pack 14 – Animal Man, Starfire, Adam Strange
Three Pack 15 – ?? 
Three Pack 16 – ??
Three Pack 17 – Batwoman, Nightwing (Red), Robin (Tim Drake)
Three Pack 18 – Sinestro (Sinestro Corps Uniform), Parallax (Kyle Rayner), John Stewart (Green Power Glow)

75th Anniversary Figures
Each included a 75th anniversary collector's pin
Batman (redeco)
Black Adam (cape added)
Black Canary (redeco)
Deathstroke
Firestorm (released in Crisis packaging)
Green Lantern (Hal Jordan)
Guy Gardner (translucent green "construct" redeco)
The Joker (new)
Mr. Terrific (new)
Robin (Earth-2)
Two-Face (new)
Wonder Girl (redeco of original figure)
Wonder Woman (reissue of single #27)

Three Packs
Robin, Dr. Light, Ravager
Trickster, The Flash, Heatwave

Batman: Gotham Knight
Three Pack – Batman, Scarecrow, Deadshot (Batman: Gotham Knight versions)

Target Exclusives

Superman/Batman Public Enemies Three Packs
Superman, Power Girl, Lex Luthor (Battle Armor)
Batman, Black Lightning, Captain Atom

Superman/Batman Public Enemies Six Pack
Superman
Hawkman
Batman
Major Force
Gorilla Grodd
President Luthor

Toys "R" Us Exclusives

Two Packs
Guy Gardner, Black Hand
Batman, Gotham City S.W.A.T.
Flash (Wally West), Professor Zoom
Captain Marvel, Black Adam

Defense of Oa Six Pack
Guy Gardner
Hal Jordan (Green Power Glow)
John Stewart
Qwardian Soldier
2 Manhunter Robots (Battle-Damaged)

Gotham City Patrol Six Pack
Batman
Catwoman
Hush (Jason Todd)
Killer Croc
2 Gotham City S.W.A.T. Team Members

Battle for Metropolis Eight Pack
Captain Atom
Captain Marvel
Lex Luthor (battle-suit)
Superman (Kingdom Come)
4 Luthor Troopers

Walmart Exclusive

Mallah's Revenge Value Gift Pack (commonly known as "Teen Titans Six Pack")
Arsenal (unreleased single #23)
Brain (new)
Cyborg (new)
Monsieur Mallah (new)
Raven (reissue)
Robin (new, Tim Drake version)

OMAC Attack Six Pack
Booster Gold (new)
Maxwell Lord (new)
OMAC (reissue)
OMAC (reissue)
Superman (redeco of version 1 with red "heat vision" eyes)
Wonder Woman (redeco of version 1 with gold trim)

Prelude to Doomsday Six Pack
Bloodwynd (new)
Doomsday (new)
Fire (new)
Guy Gardner (redeco of version 1 in blue solo costume [non-Green Lantern, non-Warrior])
Ice (new)
Superman (redeco of version 1 with battle damage)

Movie Exclusives
Green Lantern (comes with the Best Buy exclusive version of Green Lantern: First Flight special edition DVD)
Wonder Woman (comes with the Best Buy exclusive version of Wonder Woman Limited Edition 2 disc package)

San Diego Comic Con Exclusives
2009: Anti-Monitor (3" version available for 50 Anti-Monitor points or $10)
2010: Starro The Conqueror: Introduction Of The JLA (window box reproduction of The Brave and the Bold issue #28 with Starro vs. Aquaman, Wonder Woman [with golden string lasso], Flash [Barry Allen], Martian Manhunter [with blue cape], and Green Lantern [Hal Jordan, with translucent green energy construct], with lights and sound narration by Kevin Conroy, original voice of Batman from Batman: The Animated Series, et al.)

Upcoming Figures
Other figures that have been seen in prototype form, read about in case breakdowns, mentioned in leaked Wal-Mart SKUs or seen at Toy Fair include:

Animal Man
Batgirl
Blue Beetle
Captain Atom (Kingdom Come appearance/added articulation)
Doctor Light (Arthur Light)
Green Lantern (Guy Gardner) (transparent green/added articulation)
Green Lantern (Hal Jordan) (added articulation)
Green Lantern (John Stewart) (transparent green/added articulation)
Harley Quinn
Hawkgirl
Heat Wave
Mr. Terrific
Poison Ivy
Ravager (Rose Wilson)
Trickster

DC Universe Fighting Figures
These are 3-inch scale figures with identical sculpts to the 6-inch figures with limited articulation, display stands and action features and/or weapons. These were previously going to be called Battleague figures and marketed as game figures but were later on consolidated into the DC Universe line as collectible figurines.

Figures
Catwoman vs. Batman
The Joker vs. Batgirl
Superman vs. Darkseid
Two-Face vs. Batman
Two-Face vs. Robin

Unreleased
The backs of the figure packages featured many more Fighting Figures but apparently none of them were released.

DC Universe Giants of Justice
While the Fighting Figures are half the size of the main line. These are double-sized versions of characters previously released as 6" figures. It is a continuation of the Mattel 12" Batman and Mattel 12" DC Superheroes line.

Series One
The first Giants of Justice were released practically unannounced. As soon as the line was mentioned by Mattel, they were already showing up in Toys "R" Us locations and eBay.

Batman (costume repainted gray and blue)
Batman (variant, costume repainted gray and black)
Killer Croc (classic)
Superman (classic)
Cyborg Superman (Villain)

SDCC 2009 Exclusive
Flash (Barry Allen)

See also
Batman (2003 toy line)
DC Superheroes
Marvel Legends, Marvel Comics' counterpart to DC Universe Classics
Marvel Universe, a toyline similar to Infinite Heroes featuring Marvel Comics characters

External links
DC Universe Classics at Batman: Yesterday, Today, and Beyond
DC Universe Infinite Heroes at Batman: Yesterday, Today, and Beyond
DC Universe Classics, DCIH and JLU Toy Archives @ Legions Of Gotham
DC Universe Classics at Toy News International
DCUC Info Archive
Review of DC Universe Fighting Figures
Review of DCUC Series 2 and Gorilla Grodd
DC Universe Infinite Heroes Archive
The Rumorbuster Infinite Heroes gallery, news and checklist
Free DC Universe iOS Checklist Application
DC Action Figures & Collectibles @ Hot Toys and Action Figures

Further reading
 

Mattel
2000s toys
DC Comics action figure lines